In statistics, the matrix variate beta distribution is a generalization of the beta distribution.

Here  is the multivariate beta function:

where  is the multivariate gamma function given by

Theorems

Distribution of matrix inverse 

Orthogonal transform

If  is any constant ,  matrix of rank , then  has a generalized matrix variate beta distribution, specifically .

Partitioned matrix results

If  and we partition  as

  is independent of 
 
 
  has an inverted matrix variate t distribution, specifically

Wishart results

Mitra proves the following theorem which illustrates a useful property of the matrix variate beta distribution.  Suppose  are independent Wishart  matrices .  Assume that  is positive definite and that . If

where , then  has a matrix variate beta distribution .

See also 

 Matrix variate Dirichlet distribution

References

Random matrices
Multivariate continuous distributions